"The Funk Phenomena" is a single from Armand Van Helden's debut studio album Old School Junkies: The Album (1996). The song uses samples from "How High" by Method Man & Redman, "Who Is He (And What Is He to You)" by Creative Source and "Don't Throw My Love Around" by Cooly's Hot Box.

Formats and track listings

CD single (1)
 "The Funk Phenomena"
 "The Funk Phenomena" (radio edit 1)
 "The Funk Phenomena" (radio edit 2)

CD single (2)
"The Funk Phenomena" (original mix)
"The Funk Phenomena" (radio edit)
"The Funk Phenomena" (Johnickennydope Mastermix)
"The Funk Phenomena" (Edge Factor dub)
"The Funk Phenomena" (Ras mix)
"The Funk Phenomena" (Ms. T's Phenomenal mix)
"The Funk Phenomena" (Johnick Manhattan Special mix)
"The Funk Phenomena" (X-Mix remix)

12" single (1)
"The Funk Phenomena" (Johnickennydope Mastermix)
"The Funk Phenomena" (original mix)
"The Funk Phenomena" (Matthias edit 1)
"The Funk Phenomena" (Matthias edit 2)
"The Funk Phenomena" (Ras mix)
"The Funk Phenomena" (Ras mix 2)
"The Funk Phenomena" (Ms. T's Phenomenal mix)
"The Funk Phenomena" (Edge Factor dub)

12" single (2)
"The Funk Phenomena" (Johnick Manhattan Special mix)
"The Funk Phenomena" (X-Mix remix)
"The Funk Phenomena" (Ms. T's Phenomenal Mix)
"The Funk Phenomena" (radio edit)
"The Funk Phenomena" (Johnickennydope Mastermix)
"The Funk Phenomena" (original mix)
"The Funk Phenomena" (Ras mix)
"The Funk Phenomena" (Edge Factor dub)

Amazon.com Exclusive
"The Funk Phenomena" (Da Hool Remix)
"The Funk Phenomena" (Mo-Ryn's Electrobreaker Remix)
"The Funk Phenomena" (Santos Pandemonium Remix)
"The Funk Phenomena" (Sound Bluntz Remix)
"The Funk Phenomena" (X-Mix Remix)

Personnel
 Armand Van Helden – producer

Sample credits
"How High" by Method Man & Redman
"Who Is He (And What Is He to You)" by Creative Source
"Don't Throw My Love Around" by Cooly's Hot Box.

Chart performance

References

External links
 Music video on YouTube

1996 singles
Armand Van Helden songs
Songs written by Armand Van Helden
1996 songs
Songs written by Method Man